The 2021–22 season is Salford City's 82nd year in their history and third consecutive season in League Two. Along with the league, the club will also compete in the FA Cup, the EFL Cup and the EFL Trophy. The season covers the period from 1 July 2021 to 30 June 2022.

Pre-season friendlies
Salford City announced they would play friendlies against Atherton Collieries, Derby County, Curzon Ashton and Lincoln City as part of their pre-season preparations.

Competitions

League Two

League table

Results summary

Results by matchday

Matches
Salford City's league fixtures were announced on 24 June 2021.

FA Cup

Salford City were drawn away to Dagenham & Redbridge in the first round and at home to Chesterfield in the second round.

EFL Cup

EFL Trophy

Transfers

Transfers in

Loans in

Loans out

Transfers out

References

Salford City
Salford City F.C. seasons